Kevin Stonehouse (20 September 1959 – 28 July 2019) was an English professional footballer who played as a striker for Shildon (two spells), Blackburn Rovers, Huddersfield Town, Blackpool, Darlington, Carlisle United, Rochdale and Bishop Auckland.

He later worked for Darlington in roles including that of Football in the Community officer and for Newcastle United as a scout.

Stonehouse died on 28 July 2019 at the age of 59.

References
General

Specific

1959 births
2019 deaths
English footballers
Sportspeople from Bishop Auckland
Footballers from County Durham
Association football forwards
Shildon A.F.C. players
Blackburn Rovers F.C. players
Huddersfield Town A.F.C. players
Blackpool F.C. players
Darlington F.C. players
Carlisle United F.C. players
Rochdale A.F.C. players
Bishop Auckland F.C. players
English Football League players
Darlington F.C. non-playing staff
Newcastle United F.C. non-playing staff